Peter Kirk (February 15, 1840 – May 4, 1916) was a British-born American businessman who founded the City of Kirkland in King County, Washington,  United States.  The town is named in his honor.

Kirk was born in Townend, Chapel-en-le-Frith, Derbyshire, England. He founded Kirkland initially as a steelworkers' town. Peter wanted Kirkland to become the "Pittsburgh of the West" through his Great Western Iron and Steel Company. He died during his sleep in Friday Harbor, Washington. He is buried outside Friday Harbor.

References

1860 births
1916 deaths
People from Chapel-en-le-Frith
People from Kirkland, Washington
People from Friday Harbor, Washington
19th-century English businesspeople